

It All Starts with One is the sixth studio album by Norwegian singer-songwriter Ane Brun, released in the UK on 24 October 2011 and in the US on 1 November 2011. The album was released as a standard single CD with ten tracks, or as a two-disc "deluxe edition" on both CD and vinyl, with an additional eight tracks on the second CD and five tracks on the second vinyl disc. The track "Worship" features guest vocals from José González.

The album was originally intended to be completed and released in 2010, but recording was delayed for a year when Brun was asked to be a backing singer on Peter Gabriel's New Blood tour, having contributed to the re-recording of "Don't Give Up" on the accompanying album.

The album was first released in the Scandinavian countries on 6 September 2011. It debuted at No. 1 in both Brun's native Norway and in her adopted homeland of Sweden, becoming the first album by a Norwegian artist ever to top the Swedish album charts. The album was subsequently released throughout Europe during September, before its release in the UK and US.

The music videos for "Words", "One", "Worship" and "Do You Remember" were taken from a short film titled ONE, which was directed by Brun's regular directorial partner, Magnus Renfors.

It All Starts with One was subsequently certified as 2× platinum by the International Federation of the Phonographic Industry of Norway, for 40,000 sales.

Track listings
From Balloon Ranger Recordings.

Standard edition

CD deluxe edition (second disc)

Vinyl deluxe edition (second disc)

Certifications

References

2011 albums
Ane Brun albums